381st may refer to:

381st Bombardment Squadron, inactive United States Air Force unit
381st Fighter Squadron or 18th Reconnaissance Squadron, squadron of the United States Air Force
381st Intelligence Squadron, intelligence unit located at Joint Base Elmendorf-Richardson, Alaska
381st Training Group at Vandenberg AFB, California provides training for the nation's space and intercontinental ballistic missile (ICBM) operations

See also
381 (number)
381, the year 381 (CCCLXXXI) of the Julian calendar
381 BC